A Carnival of Hits is a compilation album credited to Judith Durham and the Seekers. It was released in the United Kingdom in April 1994 to coincide with the Seekers reunion tour.

Track listing
CD (EMI – 724382915126)
 "Morningtown Ride" – 2:40
 "A World of Our Own" – 2:41
 "Island of Dreams" – 2:24
 "Red Rubber Ball" – 2:12
 "Colours of My Life" – 2:32
 "Georgy Girl" – 2:15
 "This Land Is Our Land" – 2:35
 "The Carnival is Over" – 3:14
 "When Will the Good Apples Fall" – 2:35
 "Someday One Day" – 2:33
 "Kumbaya" – 2:31
 "The 59th Street Bridge Song (Feelin' Groovy)" – 2:15
 "Walk with Me" – 3:13
 "The Leaving of Liverpool" – 2:53
 "I'll Never Find Another You" – 2:42
 "This Little Light of Mine" – 2:14
 "The Times They are A-Changin'" – 2:34
 "We Shall Not Be Moved" – 2:22
 "One World Love" – 3:09
 "Keep a Dream in Your Pocket" – 3:17

Charts

References

External links
 A Carnival of Hits at Discogs

1994 compilation albums
Judith Durham compilation albums
The Seekers compilation albums
EMI Records compilation albums